The Adventurer is a 1928 American silent adventure film directed by Viktor Tourjansky and an uncredited W.S. Van Dyke with a screenplay written by Ruth Cummings and Jack Cunningham. The film stars Tim McCoy, Dorothy Sebastian, Charles Delaney, George Cowl and Michael Visaroff. The film was released on July 14, 1928, by Metro-Goldwyn-Mayer.

Plot
Mining engineer Jim McClellan is in love with Dolores de Silva, the daughter of the deposed president of a South American country. McClellan tries to help de Silva regain power but finds himself involved in a series of dangerous adventures that even lead him to a firing squad. Eventually, the revolutionaries are defeated and the president returns to the government while McClellan finally wins the girl he loves.

Cast 
Tim McCoy as Jim McClellan
Dorothy Sebastian as Dolores de Silva
Charles Delaney as Barney O'Malley
George Cowl as Esteban de Silva
Michael Visaroff as Somaroff
Gayne Whitman as The Tornado
Alex Melesh as John Milton Gibbs
Katherine Block as Duenna

References

External links 
 

1928 films
1920s English-language films
American adventure films
1928 adventure films
Metro-Goldwyn-Mayer films
Films directed by Victor Tourjansky
Films directed by W. S. Van Dyke
American black-and-white films
American silent feature films
1920s American films
Silent adventure films